Whitfield Valley is a local nature reserve on the northern fringe of Stoke-on-Trent, England.

Description

The reserve, of area , was designated a local nature reserve (LNR) in 1991. It is owned and managed by Stoke-on-Trent City Council.

Ford Green Brook flows south through the site, between Chell and Bradeley to the west and Norton le Moors to the east. At the northern end  is the former spoil heap of the Chatterley Whitfield colliery; in the south is Ford Green. The reed bed at Ford Green is a Site of Special Scientific Interest.

Within the reserve there is grassland, heathland, lakes and scattered trees.

The former colliery spoil heap is a site for Birdsfoot trefoil, which supports dingy skipper butterflies. In the grassland, skylarks and grey partridges may be seen. The lakes are a habitat for water birds.

References

Local nature reserves in Staffordshire
Lakes of Staffordshire
Parks and open spaces in Staffordshire